Jerome John Standaert (November 2, 1901 – August 4, 1964) was an infielder in Major League Baseball who played for the Brooklyn Robins and Boston Red Sox in part of three seasons spanning 1925–1929.

He was born in Chicago, Illinois.

External links

1901 births
1964 deaths
Major League Baseball infielders
Brooklyn Robins players
Boston Red Sox players
Baseball players from Chicago
Milwaukee Brewers (minor league) players
Watertown Cubs players
Marshall Indians players
Shreveport Gassers players
Winston-Salem Twins players
Springfield Ponies players
Memphis Chickasaws players
Mobile Bears players
Nashville Vols players
Springfield Senators players
Cedar Rapids Raiders players